The Y may refer to:

Enterprises
 YMCA, a worldwide youth organization 
 YWCA, a worldwide youth organization 
 YM-YWHA, a youth organization operated by the Jewish Community Center in the US 
 Brigham Young University, a university in the US state of Utah

Music and film
 The Y's, the production team of Justin Timberlake, James Fauntleroy and Rob Knox
 The Y (film), a 2023 Indian film

Places
 The Y, West Virginia, a community in the United States
 Why, Arizona, a town in the United States

See also
 YMCA (disambiguation)
 YWCA (disambiguation)
 Y (disambiguation)
 They (disambiguation)